The fifth season of M*A*S*H aired Tuesdays at 9:00–9:30 pm on CBS.

Cast

Episodes

Notes

External links 
 List of M*A*S*H (season 5) episodes at the Internet Movie Database

References

1976 American television seasons
1977 American television seasons
MASH 05